Prokopovich is a Russian-language patronymic surname derived from the Slavic first name Prokop, from Latin name Procopius. It corresponds to Polish Prokopowicz, Ukrainian Prokopovych, and Belarusian Prakapovich.

"Prokopovich" may also be a patronymic part of a full East Slavic name, however with a different pronunciation: the surname has the penultimate accent, while the patronymic retains the accent of the first name Prokop, i.e., on the second syllable.

The surname Prokopovich may refer to:

Theophan Prokopovich (1681-1736), Russian archbishop
Sergei Prokopovich (1871-1955), Russian Russian economist, sociologist, and politician

See also
 
6681 Prokopovich, asteroid

Ukrainian-language surnames
Patronymic surnames